Liantang may refer to:
 Liantang Subdistrict, a subdistrict of Luohu District, Shenzhen, China
 Liantang, Gaoyao, a town in Zhaoqing, Guangdong, China
 Liantang, a town in Qingpu District, Shanghai, China
 Liantang, a former town in Changshu, China